Henry Fortescue (by 1515 – 1576), of Faulkbourne, Essex, was an English politician.

He was a Member (MP) of the Parliament of England for Maldon in March 1553 and for Sudbury in 1559, and High Sheriff of Essex and Hertfordshire in 1563.

References

1576 deaths
People from Braintree District
Year of birth uncertain
Members of Parliament for Maldon
Henry
English MPs 1553 (Edward VI)
English MPs 1559
High Sheriffs of Essex
High Sheriffs of Hertfordshire